Epelis truncataria, the black-banded orange, is a species of geometrid moth in the family Geometridae. It is found in North America.

The MONA or Hodges number for Epelis truncataria is 6321.

References

Further reading

External links

 

Macariini
Articles created by Qbugbot
Moths described in 1862